Pavla Vas is a settlement south of Tržišče in the Municipality of Sevnica in east-central Slovenia. The area is part of the historical region of Lower Carniola. The municipality is now included in the Lower Sava Statistical Region.

Church

The local church is dedicated to Saint James and belongs to the Parish of Tržišče. It is a medieval building with a Romanesque nave that was restyled in the Baroque in the 17th century.

References

External links

Pavla Vas at Geopedia

Populated places in the Municipality of Sevnica